Voorst-Empe is a railway station serving the villages Voorst and Empe in the Netherlands. The station was opened in 1876 (as Voorst), closed in 1938 and reopened in 2006. It is located on the Amsterdam–Zutphen railway, between Apeldoorn and Zutphen. The train services are operated by Arriva.

Train services
The following services currently call at Voorst-Empe:
2x per hour local services (stoptrein) Apeldoorn - Zutphen

External links
NS website 
Dutch Public Transport journey planner 

Railway stations in Gelderland
Railway stations opened in 1876
Brummen